Brian Ferlin (born June 3, 1992) is an American former professional ice hockey winger who played in the Boston Bruins organization of the National Hockey League (NHL).  He was selected by the Bruins in the 4th round (121st overall) of the 2011 NHL Entry Draft.

Playing career
Ferlin played collegiate hockey in the NCAA Men's Division I college hockey for the Cornell Big Red men's ice hockey team in the ECAC Hockey conference.  In 2012, he was awarded Cornell's Greg Ratushny Award presented to the most promising freshman.

Prior to attending Cornell University, Ferlin played junior hockey with the Indiana Ice in the United States Hockey League. Ferlin's outstanding play during the 2010–11 season was rewarded with him being selected to play in the 2011 USHL All-Star Game.

On April 11, 2014, at the completion of his collegiate career, Ferlin signed a two-year entry-level contract with the Boston Bruins.

In the 2014–15 season, Ferlin made his professional debut with the Bruins AHL affiliate in Providence. On February 20, 2015, Ferlin made his NHL debut in a game against the St. Louis Blues. He scored his first NHL point, an assist, during the following game against the Chicago Blackhawks on February 22, 2015.

On July 1, 2017, Ferlin signed a one-year, two-way deal as a free agent with the Edmonton Oilers. After he was cleared to return, he played in just 7 games with AHL affiliate, the Bakersfield Condors, before he was removed from the roster, citing retirement.

Career statistics

Awards and honors

References

External links 

1992 births
Living people
American men's ice hockey right wingers
Bakersfield Condors players
Boston Bruins draft picks
Boston Bruins players
Cornell Big Red men's ice hockey players
Ice hockey people from Florida
Indiana Ice players
Providence Bruins players
Sportspeople from Jacksonville, Florida